Czterdzisty pierwszy is an album by Kazik, released on October 1, 2004 through S.P. Records.

Track listing

CD one
 "Stalingrad (Adam und Klara)"
 "Bomba" (Bomb)
 "Idol"
 "Maria" (Mary)
 "Down in Another Hole"
 "Pani Katarzyna" (Mrs. Katherine)
 "Zielone karty" (Green Cards)
 "Anarchia w WC" (Anarchy in the WC)
 "Czego zechcesz synu, gdy wszystkiego masz już w bród?" (What Will You Desire, Son, When You Have Enough of Everything?)
 "Nasza kompania" (Our Company)
 "Sfizohremja" (Sphizochremya)
 "Dzisiaj przyjeżdża Krysia" (Christine Arrives Today)

CD two
 "Kryzys energetyczny" (Energetic Crisis)
 "George W. Bush kocha Polskę" (George W. Bush Loves Poland)
 "Tortury" (Tortures)
 "Chopie, nie szalej!" (Calm Down, Man!)
 "Czasem mi się zdaje" (Sometimes It Seems to Me)
 "Lili Marleen"
 "Dzisiejszy styl" (Today's Style)
 "Proces bandy Gorfryda" (The Trial of Gorfryd's Gang)
 "Paraliż!" (Paralysis!)
 "Na lewo most, na prawo most" (A Bridge to the Left, a Bridge to the Right)
 "Polska płonie" (Poland's Burning)
 "40 lat minęło" (40 Years Have Passed) (Andrzej Rosiewicz)

2004 albums
Kazik Staszewski albums